Dr. Arch Jordan House, also known as the manse for Little River Presbyterian Church, is a historic home located near Caldwell, Orange County, North Carolina.  It was built about 1875, and is a two-story, single pile, central hall plan, Italianate style frame dwelling.   It features a central projecting gable, bracketed eaves, and a columned porch with a low hipped roof. Attached at the rear is an originally-separate two-story kitchen building. Also on the property are the contributing combination smokehouse/food storage shed, log and weatherboard tobacco barn, and -story main barn.

It was listed on the National Register of Historic Places in 1998. Dr. Jordan, a prominent physician. Across NC 57 Dr. Jordan built the Little River General Store and Pharmacy, circa 1870. He taught at the nearby Caldwell Institute, a residential secondary school during the late nineteenth and early twentieth centuries.

References

Houses on the National Register of Historic Places in North Carolina
Italianate architecture in North Carolina
Houses completed in 1875
Houses in Orange County, North Carolina
National Register of Historic Places in Orange County, North Carolina